The 1999 Western Kentucky Hilltoppers football team represented Western Kentucky University in the 1999 NCAA Division I-AA football season and were led by head coach Jack Harbaugh. The Hilltoppers rejoined the Ohio Valley Conference as a football only member this year; the school left the OVC in 1982 and had been a football independent since.  
The team’s roster included future NFL players Joseph Jefferson, Rod “He Hate Me” Smart, Sherrod Coates, Mel Mitchell, Bobby Sippio, and Ben Wittman, as well as future NFL coach Jason Michael.  Patrick Goodman was named to the AP All American team.  The All OVC Team included Goodman, Sippio, Smart, Melvin Wisham, Wittman and Mitchell.

Schedule

References

Western Kentucky 
Western Kentucky Hilltoppers football seasons
Western Kentucky Hilltoppers football